This is a list of the 14 members of the European Parliament for Slovakia in the 2019 to 2024 session.

These MEPs were elected at the 2019 European Parliament election in Slovakia.

List 

On the Progressive Slovakia–Together list: (Renew)–(EPP Group)
Michal Šimečka (PS)
Vladimír Bilčík (SPOLU)
Michal Wiezik (SPOLU)
Martin Hojsík (PS)

On the Direction – Social Democracy list: (S&D)
Monika Beňová
Miroslav Čiž
Róbert Hajšel

On the Kotleba – People's Party Our Slovakia list: (Non-Inscrits)
Milan Uhrík
Miroslav Radačovský

On the Freedom and Solidarity list: (ECR)
Lucia Ďuriš Nicholsonová
Eugen Jurzyca

On the Christian Democratic Movement list: (EPP Group)
Ivan Štefanec
Miriam Lexmann – since 1 February 2020

On the Ordinary People and Independent Personalities list: (EPP Group)
Peter Pollák

Replacements 

 Miriam Lexmann took her newly created seat following Brexit
 Katarína Roth Neveďalová replaced Miroslav Číž following his death on 29 December 2022

References

See also 

 List of members of the European Parliament, 2019–2024
 2019 European Parliament election
 Politics of Slovakia

Lists of Members of the European Parliament for Slovakia
Lists of Members of the European Parliament 2019–2024
MEPs for Slovakia 2019–2024